{{Infobox legislature
 | name               = Seventh Punjab Legislative Assembly 
 | native_name        = 
 | native_name_lang   = 
 | transcription_name = 
 | legislature        = Punjab Legislative Assembly
 | coa_pic            = 
 | coa_res            = 250px
 | coa_alt            = 
 | house_type         = Unicameral
 | term_length        = 1977-1980
 | body               = 
 | houses             = 
 | foundation = 30 June 1977
 | disbanded = 17 February 1980
 | preceded_by = Sixth Punjab Legislative Assembly
 | succeeded_by = Eighth Punjab Legislative Assembly
 | leader1_type       = Speaker 
 | leader1            = Ravi Inder Singh
 | party1    = 
 | leader2   = 
 | leader3_type       = Deputy Speaker
 | leader3           = Panna Lal Nayyar
 | leader4            = 
 | leader5_type       = Leader of House(Chief Minister)
| leader5             =Parkash Singh Badal
| leader6             =
 | leader7_type       = Leader of the Opposition
 | leader7            = Balram Jakhar
 | leader8            = 
 | committees1        = 
 | committees2        = 
 | joint_committees   = 
 | voting_system1     = first-past-the-post
 | voting_system2     = 
 | last_election1     = 1977
 | next_election1     = 1980
 | redistricting = 
 | session_room       = 
 | session_res        = 
 | session_alt        = 
 | meeting_place      = 
 | members            = 117
 | structure1    = 
 | structure1_res = 
 | political_groups1  = Government (98)
  SAD+ (83) 
  SAD (58)
  JP (25)
 Confidence and supply (15)   CPIM (8)
  CPI (7)Opposition (19)  INC (17)
  IND (2)
 
}} 
The 1977 Punjab Legislative Assembly election''' was the seventh Vidhan Sabha (Legislative Assembly) election of the state. Shiromani Akali Dal and Janata Party coalition emerged as the victorious with 83 seats in the 117-seat legislature in the election. The Indian National Congress became the official opposition, holding 17 seats. On 17 February 1980, Assembly dissolved prematurely and president rule was imposed.

History
After withdrawal of National Emergency in India, fresh election held in Punjab along with other States. Shiromani Akali Dal and Janata Party fought election in coalition and won. Communist Party of India and Communist Party of India (Marxist) extended outside support to the Government.

Despite Indian National Congress contested more seats than Janata Party but could able to won 17 seats and stood at third place for the first time in Punjab.

Dissolution of Assembly

Notes

References

7th
 
1977 establishments in Punjab, India